Bayan-Gol is a rural locality (an ulus) in Khorinsky District, Republic of Buryatia, Russia. The population was 334 as of 2010. There are 10 streets.

Geography 
Bayan-Gol is located 35 km west of Khorinsk (the district's administrative centre) by road. Udinsk is the nearest rural locality.

References 

Rural localities in Khorinsky District